Chris Markwood (born December 22, 1981) is an American basketball coach who is the current head coach of the Maine Black Bears men's basketball team.

Playing career
Markwood played high school basketball at South Portland High School where he was named Maine's Gatorade Player of the Year in 2000. He began his college career at Notre Dame for two seasons before transferring to Maine for his final two seasons, where he was a team captain.

Coaching career
After graduation, Markwood started his coaching career at his alma mater, assisting the Black Bears under Ted Woodward for six seasons before joining the staff at Vermont where he was part of the Catamounts' 2012 NCAA tournament appearance. He'd then move on to Northeastern from 2014 to 2021, where he was part of two NCAA appearances in 2015 and 2019 as well as a CAA regular season and tournament title in 2015. In 2021, Markwood would join Earl Grant's staff at Boston College for a single season before being named the head coach at Maine on March 21, 2022, replacing Richard Barron.

Personal life
Markwood is married to the former Ashley Underwood, an all-conference selection at Maine for its women's basketball team. She was also the 2009 Miss Maine USA and a contestant on Survivor: Redemption Island.

Head coaching record

References

Living people
1981 births
American men's basketball coaches
Maine Black Bears men's basketball coaches
Vermont Catamounts men's basketball coaches
Northeastern Huskies men's basketball coaches
Boston College Eagles men's basketball coaches
Notre Dame Fighting Irish men's basketball players
Maine Black Bears men's basketball players
People from South Portland, Maine
Basketball coaches from Maine
Basketball players from Maine
South Portland High School alumni